FutureSex/LoveShow: Live from Madison Square Garden is the second live video album by American singer-songwriter Justin Timberlake. It was released on November 19, 2007, by Jive Records.

Track listing

Charts

Certifications

Release history

References 

2007 video albums
Justin Timberlake albums
Jive Records video albums
Live video albums
Albums recorded at Madison Square Garden
HBO network specials
Television shows directed by Marty Callner